Jean Alazard (5 August 1887 – 3 October 1960) was a French art historian who was an expert on the art of the Renaissance and Orientalism.

Early life
Alazard was born in Lacalm in the Aveyron. He attended the Lycée and moved to Italy, where he became an authority on the art of the Renaissance.

Algeria
In 1921 Alazard moved to Algeria where he continued his research into Italian art and began to be interested in Orientalism.

Alazard was the first curator of the National Museum of Fine Arts of Algiers from 1930 to 1960.

Selected publications
Michelangelo Sculptures. Tudor Publishing, New York, 1965.
The Florentine portrait. Schocken Books, New York, 1968.
Ingres et L'Ingrisme.
L'Orient et la peinture française.

References

1887 births
1960 deaths
French art historians
People from Aveyron
French male non-fiction writers
20th-century French male writers